Mahathobhara Yelluru Shree Vishweshwara Temple is a Hindu temple dedicated to Lord Vishweshwara (Shiva) in the Yellur village of Udupi district in the state of Karnataka, India. Lord Vishweshwara is referred to at least in 12 rock edicts and recorded by the Kaifiyaths.

History 
The temple that belongs to the Maagane that comprises Nandikooru (Adve, Ulluru, Kolachuru), Kalathuru, Kutyaru, Padooru, Belapu and Kunjoor, has a rich history of over 1,000 years.The temple has been renovated and inaugurated in grand functions lasting from 4 March 2009 to 12 March 2009.

Devotees here pay their respect to Lord Vishweshwara by offering tender coconut Abhishekham, lit oil lamps and gold coins (pawan). It is believed that the Lord will grant all their prayers. The story goes that the Lord Ullaya got pleased with the penance observed by a devotee who belonged to the Kunda Hegde family and as result he descended from Kashi to Yelluru. It is known as the divine place of Swayambhu Saannidhya.

Architecture 
The architecture of the temple is unique and considered a classic one in the view of the Tantragama experts. The age-old temple has been considered as the perfect and unique model of the Devaayathana style of architecture.

Legends

The Lord Vishveshwara is believed to have emerged from underground respecting the devotion of a Samanta Raja of Kuthyar Dynasty. The linga of the Lord Shiva thus emerged and was first understood to have been found by a Koraga community (Scheduled Tribe) mother while she was collecting firewood and leaves in the forest where her son "Yellu" was buried after his untimely death. While cutting the bush she hit the ground and the earth is said to have started bleeding. Scared by the flow of blood she screamed "Oh, Maga Yellu, yei Moolu Ullana?" (meaning 'Oh, my son Yellu, are you here?') in Tulu. In fact it was the "Linga" itself, and it is said that the mark of the wound is still on it. And the village was thereafter known from Yelluna Ooru to gradually Yellur.

References

External links 
Official Website
Wikimapia-Yelluru Shri Vishweshwara Temple

Shiva temples in Karnataka
Hindu temples in Udupi district